The 1905 Wisconsin Badgers football team represented the University of Wisconsin in the 1905 Western Conference football season. Philip King, who helmed the team from 1896 to 1902, returned for his eighth and final season as head coach. The Badgers compiled an overall record of 8–2 with a mark of 1–2 in conference play, placing fifth in the Western Conference. The team's captain was E. J. Vanderboom.

Schedule

References

Wisconsin
Wisconsin Badgers football seasons
Wisconsin Badgers football